Noel Drayton (October 7, 1913 – December 7, 1981) was an actor who remains perhaps best known for playing supporting roles in Hollywood films like Elephant Walk, The Court Jester, Plymouth Adventure and Botany Bay during the 1950s. He also appeared as a guest actor on television shows like You Are There, Perry Mason and Alfred Hitchcock Presents. He is also known for the role of Mr. Hardcastle in nine episodes of the popular television show Family Affair.

There is little information provided about Drayton's life. Born in South Africa, he made his film debut with a notable supporting role in Jean Negulesco's Hollywood movie Under My Skin (1950). He remained very active as an actor during the 1950s, but his roles got smaller during the 1960s. He retired in 1969 and returned only for one movie into acting business: Gone with the West (1975), which was his final movie. He died on December 7, 1981, in Sedona, Arizona.

Partial filmography
 Under my Skin (1950) - George Gardner
 Plymouth Adventure (1952) - Miles Standish
 Blackbeard the Pirate (1952) - Jeremy
 Botany Bay (1952) - Second Mate Spencer
 The Desert Rats (1953) - Captain (uncredited)
 You Are There (1953-1956, TV, 6 episodes) - Judge Heywood / Governor Hutchinson / Captain Smith / Secretary of Senate
 Knock on Wood (1954) - Little Man (uncredited)
 Elephant Walk (1954) - Planter Atkinson
 The Seven Little Foys (1955) - Priest (uncredited)
 The Virgin Queen (1955) - Tailor (uncredited)
 The Court Jester (1955) - Fergus
 The 20th Century-Fox Hour (1955-1956; TV, 3 episodes) - Wilkins / Hedges / Alfred Bridges
 TV Reader's Digest (1956; TV, 2 episodes) - Detective Inspector Herbert Gold / Captain Connor / Earl of Warwick
 20 Million Miles to Earth (1957) - 1st Reuters News Correspondent (uncredited)
 Across the Bridge (1957) - Reporter
 Zero Hour! (1957) - Vancouver Control Man
 Hong Kong Confidential (1958) - Owen Howard
 Perry Mason (1958-1965; TV, 3 episodes) - Mr. Costelni / Art Expert / Ellis / Frank Buchanan - Ship Purser
 The Wreck of the Mary Deare (1959) - Charlie Bell (uncredited)
 Alfred Hitchcock Presents (1960; TV, 1 episode) - Ben Huggins
 Sea Hunt (1960-1961; TV, 3 episodes) - Dr. Graham / Dr. Wells (Season 4, Episode 11)/ Thomas Sherington / Lloyd Shepard
 A Public Affair (1962)
 The Prize (1963) - Constable Ströhm (uncredited)
 The Man from U.N.C.L.E. (1964; TV, 1 episode) - Dr. Parker
 Strange Bedfellows (1965) - Cab Driver (uncredited)
 Assault on a Queen (1966) - Elevator Operator (uncredited)
 The Wrecking Crew (1968) - Lord Hardwicke (uncredited)
 Family Affair (1966-1970; TV series, 9 episodes) - Mr. Hardcastle
 Topaz (1969) - Servant at Embassy (uncredited)
 Gone with the West (1975) - Wagon Driver (final film role)

External links 
 

American male film actors
1913 births
1981 deaths
20th-century American male actors
South African emigrants to the United States
People from Cape Town